Sri Lanka is a tropical island situated close to the southern tip of India. The invertebrate fauna there is large as is common in other tropical regions of the world. There are about 2 million species of arthropods found in the world, with more being discovered every year. Thus, it is very complicated and difficult to summarize the exact number of species found within a certain region.

The following list is about Neuroptera recorded in Sri Lanka.

Lacewing
Phylum: Arthropoda
Class: Insecta
Order: Neuroptera

Neuroptera, or net-winged insects, includes the lacewings, mantidflies, antlions, and their relatives. The order contains about 6,000 species. The group was once known as Planipennia, and at that time also included alderflies, fishflies, dobsonflies, and snakeflies, but these are now generally considered to be separate orders (the Megaloptera and Raphidioptera). This is either placed at superorder rank, with the Endopterygota becoming an unranked clade above it, or the Endopterygota are maintained as a superorder, with an unranked Neuropterida being a part of them. Within the endopterygotes, the closest living relatives of the neuropteridan clade are the beetles. The common name lacewings is often used for the most widely known net-winged insects – the green lacewings (Chrysopidae) – but actually most members of the Neuroptera are referred to as some sort of "lacewing".

The following list provide the lacewings currently identified in Sri Lanka. The group is one of the least concerned and identified in Sri Lanka, therefore the exact number of species is unknown.

Endemic species are denoted as E.

Family: Ascalaphidae - Owlflies
Ascalaphus dicax 
Ascalaphus sinister 
Suphalomites verbosus

Family: Berothidae - Beaded lacewings
Berotha sp.

Family: Chrysopidae - Common lacewings
Chrysopa invaria 
Italochrysa aequalis 
Plesiochrysa invaria 
Semachrysa hyndi

Family: Coniopterygidae - Dustywings
Coniocampsa indica 
Coniopteryx ambigua 
Coniopteryx ceylonica 
Coniopteryx goniocera 
Coniopteryx indica 
Coniopteryx latistylus
Coniopteryx portilloi 
Coniopteryx venustula 
Semidalis

Family: Hemerobiidae - Brown lacewings
Micromus callidus
Micromus linearis
Micromus timidus
Notiobilla viridivervis
Psectra iniqua

Family: Mantispidae - Mantidflies
Mantispa annulicornis 
Mantispa indica 
Mantispa obscurata 
Mantispa torquilla

Family: Myrmeleontidae - Antlion lacewings
Creoleon cinammomeus
Distoleon audax 
Distoleon dirus 
Hagenomyia nigrinus
Hagenomyia sagax
Indoleon barbarus
Lachlatheles contrarius
Myrmeleon berenice
Myrmeleon tenuipennis
Neuroleon guernei 
Palpares contrarius

Family: Osmylidae - Giant lacewings
Spilosmylus ceyloniensis

References

L
 
lacewings
Sri Lanka